Bridge in Dreher Township is a historic stone arch bridge located in Dreher Township, Wayne County, Pennsylvania. It is a single span, high-rise stone arch built in 1934.  It measures  and crosses the Haags Mill Creek.

It was listed on the National Register of Historic Places in 1988.

References

Road bridges on the National Register of Historic Places in Pennsylvania
Bridges completed in 1934
Bridges in Wayne County, Pennsylvania
National Register of Historic Places in Wayne County, Pennsylvania
Stone arch bridges in the United States
1934 establishments in Pennsylvania